C/ (LONEOS) is a Halley-type comet with an orbital period of 48.51 years. It was discovered on 28 July 2001 by the LONEOS telescope at Lowell Observatory. Of the short-period comets with known diameters and perihelion inside the orbit of Earth, C/ is the second largest after Comet Swift–Tuttle.

Observations taken in January and February 2002 showed that the "asteroid" had developed a small amount of cometary activity as it approached perihelion. It was subsequently reclassified as a comet. The comet came to perihelion (closest approach to the Sun) on 15 March 2002. It will come to aphelion in 2026 and the next perihelion passage is calculated to be on 7 June 2050.

The comet has a rotational period of 2.38 ± 0.02 days (57.12 hr).

In 2003, the comet was estimated to have a mean absolute V magnitude (H) of 13.05 ± 0.10, with an albedo of 0.03, giving an effective radius of 8.9 ± 0.7 km. Using data from Fernandez (2004–2005) JPL lists the comet with an albedo of 0.05 and a diameter of 13.6 ± 1.0 km.

This comet probably represents the transition between typical Halley-family/long-period comets and extinct comets. Damocloids have been studied as possible extinct cometary candidates due to the similarity of their orbital parameters with those of Halley-family comets.

See also
 List of Halley-type comets

References

External links 
 Orbital simulation from JPL (Java) / Horizons Ephemeris

Halley-type comets
Near-Earth comets
Damocloids
20010728